Athisaya Piravi is a 1990 Indian Tamil-language fantasy comedy film directed by S. P. Muthuraman and written by Panchu Arunachalam. It is a remake of the Telugu film Yamudiki Mogudu (1988). The film stars Rajinikanth, Kanaka, and Sheeba Akashdeep, while Nagesh, Jai Ganesh, Chinni Jayanth, Cho Ramaswamy, and Vinu Chakravarthy, among others, play supporting roles. It was released on 15 June 1990, and became a box office failure.

Plot 

Kaalaiyan lives a poor lifestyle with his widowed mother. He falls in love with a girl called Sumathi, but because of his poor background, Sumathi's wealthy father Murukesh is not ready to accept him. Kaalaiyan also gets into hot water with Murukesh as he opposes his men who were planning to demolish some huts. Murukesh and his partner devise a plan to kill Kaalaiyan by tricking him into believing that he was going to marry him to Sumathi. The plan works, and they eventually succeed in killing him. Kaalaiyan's spirit goes to the underworld and meets the Lord of Death himself, Yama. Kaalaiyan explains to Yama the whole ordeal and that his death was a mistake, so Yama transports him back to an identical body of a mild-mannered villager, Balu, whose life is threatened by his paternal uncle and aunt, who are trying to kill him.

Reborn as Balu, he soon adapts to his new life, along with his new widowed mother and a sweetheart, Gauri. He also sets out to teach his uncle, Chinnasamy, aunt, and cousin Periyasaamy a lesson for their ill-treatment to him and his (new) mother. Life goes on, and he has no memories of his old life until one day Murukesh, who was an old friend of Chinnasamy, comes to visit them. Seeing him, Balu remembers his previous life and immediately goes to his previous place, where he finds Murukesh's goons attacking the area. Upon seeing him alive, they all are astounded and flee from the place. He then explains to his biological mother and Sumathi the whole story of how he was killed and reincarnated. Meanwhile, Gauri comes searching for Balu to Chennai, and hilarity ensues as Balu/Kaalaiyan struggles to manage both lovers. Balu, with help of Chitragupta, plans his revenge on Murukesh and his partner by outdoing him in wealth and humiliate them, but when Balu's relatives also arrive to Chennai, the whole confusion is revealed, and Murukesh captures both the families of Kaalaiyan and Balu and tries to kill him, but Balu/Kaalaiyan thwarts his plans and ultimately succeeds in his revenge.

Cast 

 Rajinikanth as Kaalaiyan and Balu
 Kanaka as Gauri
 Sheeba Akashdeep as Sumathi
 Nagesh as Murukesh
 Jai Ganesh as Murukesh's partner
 Vijayalalitha
 Achamillai Gopi
 Sudhakar as Murukesh's partner's son
 Senthamarai as Chinnasaamy
 Chinni Jayanth as Periyasaamy
 Cho Ramaswamy as Vichitra Gupta
 Vinu Chakravarthy as Yama
 V. K. Ramasamy as Chitragupta
 Kamala Kamesh as Balu's mother
 Madhavi as Rambha (Guest appearance)
S. N. Parvathy as Kaalaiyan's mother
 King Kong as Kaalaiyan's friend
Omakuchi Narasimhan as jai ganesh's servant
 S. V. Ranga Rao as Balu's father (portrait)

Soundtrack 
The soundtrack has six songs composed by Ilaiyaraaja.

Reception 
The Indian Express wrote, "Directed by S. P. Muthuraman, who keeps the action from sagging, Panju Arunachalam redoes his Kalyanaraman idea and provides the dialogues, even as Cho keeps lighting crackers with dialogues loaded with political innuendo." P. S. S. of Kalki wrote that whenever doubt arises whether such things happen, Rajinikanth turns around and says he is there, is that not enough. According to Muthuraman, Athisaya Piravi underperformed at the box office, in contrast to the Telugu original, as the concept of life after death and reincarnation did not go down well with Tamil audiences.

Legacy 

Many years after the release of the film, a viral video entitled "Little Superstar" became very popular on the internet. The clip features the scene with Rajinikanth watching dwarf Indian actor King Kong dancing to "Holiday Rap" by MC Miker G & DJ Sven.

References

Bibliography

External links 
 

1990 comedy films
1990 films
1990s fantasy comedy films
1990s Tamil-language films
Films directed by S. P. Muthuraman
Films scored by Ilaiyaraaja
Films with screenplays by Panchu Arunachalam
Indian fantasy comedy films
Indian religious comedy films
Tamil remakes of Telugu films
Yama in popular culture